Truyolsoceras is an Upper Devonian ammonite (subclass Ammonoidea) included in the goniatitid subfamily Aulatornoceratinae. The shell is involute, lenticular, with a narrow umbilicus and moderately high aperture.  The adventitious lobe of the suture, which lies between the ventral and lateral lobes, is rounded.

References

Truyolsoceras in GONIAT 6/10/12
The Paleobiology Database Truyolsoceras entry accessed 10 June 2012

Goniatitida genera
Tornoceratidae
Ammonites of North America
Late Devonian ammonites